Anostomus is a small genus of fish in the family Anostomidae found in South America. They are found in the Orinoco and Amazon Basin, as well as various rivers in the Guianas. The genus currently contains five described species.  Petulanos was until recently included here.

Species
 Anostomus anostomus (Linnaeus, 1758) (striped anostomus, striped headstander)
 Anostomus brevior Géry, 1961
 Anostomus longus Géry, 1961
 Anostomus ternetzi Fernández-Yépez, 1949
 Anostomus ucayalensis (Fowler, 1906)

References
 

Anostomidae
Taxa named by Giovanni Antonio Scopoli
Fish of South America